The IRT Second Avenue Line, also known as the Second Avenue Elevated or Second Avenue El, was an elevated railway in Manhattan, New York City, United States, from 1878 to 1942. It was operated by the Interborough Rapid Transit Company until 1940, when the city took over the IRT. Service north of the 57th Street station ended on June 11, 1940; the rest of the line closed on June 13, 1942.

History
In 1875, the Rapid Transit Commission granted the Gilbert Elevated Railway Company the right to construct the railway from Battery Park to the Harlem River along Second Avenue.

The commission also granted the Gilbert Elevated Railway Company the right to operate the Sixth Avenue Elevated and soon afterward the Gilbert Elevated Railway changed its name to the Metropolitan Elevated Railway.

Around 1900, the line was electrified. Between 1914 and 1916 construction was undertaken to install a third track to provide express service on the line during peak hours. Express service commenced on January 17, 1916. On July 23, 1917, Second Avenue El service over the Queensborough Bridge to Queens began.

The Second Avenue El did not run entirely on Second Avenue. Its southern terminus was above Park Row adjacent to City Hall. From there it ran above Park Row to Chatham Square, where it had a junction with the Third Avenue El, then continued east above Division Street. It turned north above Allen Street to Houston Street, where it continued north above First Avenue, then turned left on 23rd Street, then ran north on Second Avenue to 129th Street. At that point it rejoined with the Third Avenue El and crossed the Harlem River into the Bronx.

As of 1934 Second Avenue service operated as follows:

 Second Avenue Local - day and evenings 129th Street to South Ferry, alternate evening and Sunday trains 129th Street to City Hall. No all-night service was operated.
 Second Avenue Express - Bronx Park to City Hall weekday and Saturday AM peak southbound, City Hall to Fordham Road or Tremont Avenue weekday PM peak northbound, also Freeman Street to City Hall via West Farms Road Line, making express stops in Manhattan.
 Second Avenue-Queens - South Ferry to Willets Point Blvd weekday and Saturday AM peak, City Hall to Willets Point Blvd weekday midday and PM peak, 57th Street to Willets Point Blvd evenings and Sundays. In addition City Hall to Astoria Weekday AM peak and midday and Saturday daytime, South Ferry to Astoria weekday PM peak, 57th Street to Astoria evenings and Sundays. Midday and Saturday trains used the express tracks, weekday peak trains made all stops.

On April 23, 1939 express service was inaugurated weekday and Saturday daytime in Queens between Queensboro Plaza and 111th Street, where elevated trains were cut back to. On September 8, 1939 Astoria trains were rerouted in the weekday PM peak to City Hall. The Second Avenue Elevated was closed north of 59th Street June 12, 1940. Evening and Sunday Queens trains were extended to City Hall or South Ferry. On May 19, 1941 evening and Sunday service was discontinued. Finally, on June 13, 1942 all service was discontinued.

The M15 bus, which runs along much of the IRT Second Avenue Elevated Line's route, is one of the busiest bus routes in New York City. However, it does not carry as many passengers as a rapid transit line, and transfers to rapid transit stations can only be made using surface connections.

The Second Avenue Subway, a rapid transit route running under Second Avenue, has been under consideration since 1919. The demolition of the IRT Second Avenue Line was in anticipation of the subway's construction. The first phase, between 72nd Street and 96th Street, opened in 2017, and a second phase to Harlem–125th Street is being planned.

Station listing

References

Further reading 
"Second Avenue El in Manhattan". By NJI Publishing with text provided by Joe Cunningham. 1995.

External links 

 
 
 

2nd Avenue
2nd Avenue
Railway lines closed in 1940